Local government in India refers to governmental jurisdictions below the level of the state.Local self-government means that residents in towns, villages and rural settlements are the people elect local councils and their heads authorising them to solve the important issues. India is a federal republic with three spheres of government: central, state and local. The 73rd and 74th constitutional amendments give recognition and protection to local governments and in addition each state has its own local government legislation. Since 1992, local government in India takes place in two very distinct forms. Urban localities, covered in the 74th amendment to the Constitution, have Nagar Palika but derive their powers from the individual state governments, while the powers of rural localities have been formalized under the panchayati raj system, under the 73rd amendment to the Constitution. 

Within the Administrative setup of India, the democratically elected Local governance bodies are called the "municipalities" (abbreviated as the "MC") in urban areas and the "Panchayati Raj Institutes (PRI)" (simply called the "panchayats") in rural areas. There are 3 types of municipalities based on the population, Municipal Corporation (Nagar Nigam) with more than 1 million population, Municipal Councils (Nagar Palika) with more than 25,000 and less than 1 million population, and Municipal Committee (Nagar Panchayat) with more than 10,000 and less than 25,000 population. PRIs in rural areas have 3 hierarchies of panchayats, Gram panchayats at village level, Mandal or block panchayats at block level, and Zilla panchayats at district level.

Panchayats cover about 96% of India's more than 5.8 lakh (580,000) villages and nearly 99.6% of the rural population. As of 2020, there were about 3 million elected representatives at all levels of the panchayat, nearly 1.3 million are women. These members represent more than 2.4 lakh (240,000) gram panchayats, about over 6,672 were intermediate level panchayat samitis at the block level and more than 500 zila parishads at district level. Following the 2013 local election, 37.1% of councillors were women, and in 2015/16 local government expenditure was 16.3% of total government expenditure.

History

Committees for the study of issues 
Various committees were formed to study the issues and make recommendations for the implementation of local governance in India.

The Balwant Rai Mehta Committee (1957) 

In 1957, a committee led by Balwant Rai Mehta Committee studied the Community Development Projects and the National Extension Service and assessed the extent to which the movement had succeeded in utilising local initiatives and in creating institutions to ensure continuity in the process of improving economic and social conditions in rural areas. The Committee held that community development would only be deep and enduring when the community was involved in the planning, decision-making and implementation process. The suggestions were for as follows:

an early establishment of elected local bodies and devolution to them of necessary resources, power, and authority,
that the basic unit of democratic decentralisation was at the block/samiti level since the area of jurisdiction of the local body should neither be too large nor too small. The block was large enough for efficiency and economy of administration, and small enough for sustaining a sense of involvement in the citizens,
such body must not be constrained by too much control by the government or government agencies,
the body must  be constituted  for five years  by indirect elections from the village panchayats,
its functions should cover the development of agriculture in all its aspects, the promotion of local industries and others
services such as drinking water, road building, etc., and
the higher-level body, Zilla Parishad, would play an advisory role.

Ashok Mehta Committee (1977)  

 
The PRi structure did not develop the requisite democratic momentum and failed to cater to the needs of rural development. There are various reasons for such an outcome which include political and bureaucratic resistance at the state level to share power and resources with local-level institutions, the domination of local elites over the major share of the benefits of welfare schemes, lack of capability at the local level and lack of political will.

It was decided to appoint a high-level committee under the chairmanship of Ashok Mehta to examine and suggest measures to strengthen PRIs. The Committee had to evolve an effective decentralised system of development for PRIs. They made the following recommendations:
the district is a viable administrative unit for which planning, coordination, and resource allocation are feasible and technical expertise available,
PRIs as a two-tier system, with Mandal Panchayat at the base and Zilla Parishad at the top,
the PRIs are capable of planning for themselves with the resources available to them,
district planning should take care of the urban-rural continuum,
representation of SCs and STs in the election to PRIs on the basis of their population,
four-year term of PRIs,
participation of political parties in elections,
any financial devolution should be committed to accepting
that much of the developmental functions at the district level
would be played by the panchayats.

The states of Karnataka, Andhra Pradesh and West Bengal passed new legislation based on this report. However, the flux in politics at the state level did not allow these institutions to develop their own political dynamics.

G.V.K. Rao Committee (1985) 

The G.V.K. Rao Committee was appointed by Planning Commission to once again look at various aspects of PRIs. The Committee was of the opinion that a total view of rural development must be taken in which PRIs must play a central role in handling people's problems. It recommended the following:-
PRIs have to be activated and provided with all the required support to become effective organisations,
PRIs at district level and below should be assigned the work of planning, implementation and monitoring of rural development programmes, and
the block development office should be the spinal cord of the rural development process.
district development commissioner to be introduced.
election should conduct regularly.
this is GVK RAO Committee main topics which they focused on.

L. M. Singhvi Committee (1986) 

A committee led by Laxmi Mall Singhvi was constituted in the 1980s to recommend ways to revitalize PRIs. The Gram Sabha was considered as the base of a municipality decentralised, and PRIs viewed as institutions of governance which would actually facilitate the participation of the people in the process of planning and development. It recommended:
local government should be constitutionally recognised, protected and preserved by the inclusion of new chapter in the Constitution,
non-involvement of political parties in Panchayat elections.

The suggestion of giving panchayats constitutional status was opposed by the Sarkaria Commission, but the idea, however, gained momentum in the late 1980s especially because of the endorsement by the late Prime Minister Rajiv Gandhi, who introduced the 64th Constitutional Amendment Bill in 1989. The 64th Amendment Bill was prepared and introduced in the lower house of Parliament. But it got defeated in the Rajya Sabha as non-convincing. He lost the general elections too. In 1989, the National Front introduced the 74th Constitutional Amendment Bill, which could not become an Act because of the dissolution of the Ninth Lok Sabha.
All these various suggestions and recommendations and means of strengthening PRIs were considered while formulating the new Constitutional Amendment Act.

Legal framework  

Following laws and subsequent amendments were passed to implement the selected recommendations of various committees.

The 73rd Constitutional Amendment Act (1992) 

The idea which produced the 73rd and Amendment was not a response to pressure from the grassroots, but to an increasing recognition that the institutional initiatives of the preceding decade had not delivered, that the extent of rural poverty was still much too large and thus the existing structure of government needed to be reformed. This idea evolved from the Centre and the state governments. It was a political drive to see PRIs as a solution to the governmental crises that India was experiencing.

The Constitutional (73rd Amendment) Act, passed in 1992 by the Narasimha Rao government, came into force on April 24, 1993. It was meant to provide constitutional sanction to establish "democracy at the grassroots level as it is at the state level or national level". Its main features are as follows:

The Gram Sabha or village assembly as a deliberative body to decentralised governance has been envisaged as the foundation of the Panchayati Raj System.73rd Amendment of the Constitution empowered the Gram Sabhas to conduct social audits in addition to its other functions.
A uniform three-tier structure of panchayats at village (Gram Panchayat — GP), intermediate or block (Panchayat Samiti — PS) and district (Zilla Parishad — ZP) levels.
All the seats in a panchayat at every level are to be filled by elections from respective territorial constituencies.
Not less than one-third of the total seats for membership as well as office of chairpersons of each tier have to be reserved for women.
Reservation for weaker castes and tribes (SCs and STs) have to be provided at all levels in proportion to their population in the panchayats.
To supervise, direct and control the  regular and smooth elections to panchayats, a State Election Commission has The Act has ensured constitution of a State Finance Commission in every State/UT, for every five years, to suggest measures to strengthen finances of panchayati raj institutions.
To promote bottom-up-planning, the District Planning Committee (DPC) in every district has been accorded to constitutional status.
An indicative list of 29 items has been given in Eleventh Schedule of the Constitution. Panchayats are expected to play an effective role in planning and implementation of works related to these 29 items.

97th Constitutional Amendment Act (2011)

Cooperative Societies are  taken under "Local Government" after 97th Constitutional Amendment act 2011,under  Dr Manmohan Singh's Govt. Part-IX of Indian Constitution is related to Local Government, under which Panchayt Raj was defined, then after 74th amendment Municipal Corporation and council were included and defined by inducing Part IX-A, and in 2011,Cooperative Societies were included in Local Government by inducing PartIX-B in the Constitution.
The 97th Constitutional Amendment Act, 2011 provided for amendment in following things :
1. It amended article 19(1)c  by inserting after the word 'or unions' the words 'or Co-operative Societies'.
2. It also inserted Article 43B in part IV of the Constitution as "The State shall endeavor to promote Voluntary formation, autonomous functioning, democratic control and professional Management of the Co-operative Societies" and 
3. After Part IX-A  of the Constitution Part IX-B was inserted. Part IX-B extended from Article 243ZH to Article 243ZT.

Types of local governance entities 

The local governance entities are broadly classified into urban and rural, which are further sub-divided based on the size of population in case of the urban bodies and based on the size of population and hierarchy in case of the rural bodies.

Urban local governance bodies

3 types of MCs 

The following 3 types of democratically elected urban local governance bodies in India are called municipalities and abbreviated as the "MC". These are classified based on the size of the population of the urban settlement.

 Municipal Corporation, also called the "Nagar Nigam", of cities with more than 1 million population.
 Municipal Councils, also called the "Nagar Palika", of cities with more than 25,000 and less than 1 million population.
 Municipal Committee, also called the "Town Council" or "Nagar Panchayat" or "Town Panchayat" or "Notified Area Council" depending on the state within which they lie, these are in the town with more than 10,000 and less than 25,000 population.

Municipal Acts 
Municipal Acts are state level legislations to establish municipal governments in urban areas. These acts provide a framework of governance for cities within the state. Various processes including rules for elections, recruitment of staff, and demarcation of urban areas derive from the state municipal acts. Almost 70 different municipal acts in India govern the cities in the country. Typically, the municipal acts are of three types - statewide general municipalities acts, separate acts for establishing municipal corporations, and acts that are specific to individual municipal corporations.

Functions of MCs 
All municipal acts in India provide for functions, powers and responsibilities to be carried out by the municipal government. These are divided into two categories: obligatory and discretionary.

The mandatory functions of MC include the supply of pure and wholesome water, construction and maintenance of public streets, lighting and watering of public streets, cleaning of public streets, places and sewers, regulation of offensive, dangerous or obnoxious trades and callings or practices, maintenance or support of public hospitals, establishment and maintenance of primary schools, registration of births and deaths, removing obstructions and projections in public streets, bridges and other places, naming streets and numbering houses, maintenance of law and public order, etc. 

The discretionary functions of MC include the laying out of areas, securing or removal of dangerous buildings or places, construction and maintenance of public parks, gardens, libraries, museums, rest houses, leper homes, orphanages and rescue homes for women, public buildings, planting of trees and maintenance of roads, housing for low income groups, conducting surveys, organizing public receptions, public exhibitions, public entertainment, provision of transport facilities with the municipality, and promotion of welfare of municipal employees.

Some of the functions of the urban bodies overlap with the work of state agencies. The functions of the municipality, including those listed in the Twelfth Schedule to the Constitution, are left to the discretion of the state government. Local bodies have to be bestowed with adequate powers, authority and responsibility to perform the functions entrusted to them by the Act. However, the Act has not provided them with any powers directly and has instead left it to state government discretion.
These are all functions of MCs

Rural local governance bodies 

The democratically elected local governance bodies in the villages of rural India are called Panchayati Raj Institutions (PRIs) which are based on the vedic era native democratic panchayat (Council of five officials) system.

3 hierarchies of PRI panchayats 

The following 3 hierarchies of PRI panchayats exist in states or Union Territories with more than two million inhabitants:

 Gram Panchayats at village level
 Panchayat Samiti/Mandal Parishad at Community Development Block/Mandal level and
 Zila Parishad at district level.

The panchayati raj system is a three-tier system with elected bodies at the village, taluk and district levels. The modern system is based in part on traditional Panchayat governance, in part on the vision of Mahatma Gandhi and in part by the work of various committees to harmonize the highly centralized Indian governmental administration with a degree of local autonomy. The result was intended to create greater participation in local government by people and more effective implementation of rural development programs. Although, as of 2015, implementation in all of India is not complete, the intention is for there to be a gram panchayat for each village or group of villages, a tehsil level council, and a zilla panchayat at the district level.

Functions of PRIs 

Defined in the Part IX of the Indian Constitution, these are responsible for the 29 subjects listed in the Eleventh Schedule including the "economic development, and strengthening social justice."

Local bodies by states of India

The Constitution of India visualises panchayats as institutions of local governance. However, giving due consideration to the federal structure of India's polity, most of the financial powers and authorities to be endowed on panchayats have been left at the discretion of concerned state legislatures. Consequently, the powers and functions vested in PRIs vary from state to state. These provisions combine representative and direct democracy into a synergy and are expected to result in an extension and deepening of democracy in India. Hence, panchayats have journeyed from an institution within the culture of India to attain constitutional status.

See also

Administrative divisions of India
Panchayati Raj
Municipal governance in India

Further reading

Shourie, Arun (1990). Individuals, institutions, processes: How one may strengthen the other in India today. New Delhi, India: Viking.

References

External links
Milestones in the Evolution of Local Government since Independence
World Bank : Overview of rural decentralization
Decentralisation in India : Challenges and opportunities, UNDP,2000 p 4
Website on Decentralisation and Local Governance in Kerala
 Official website of State Election Commission

 
Political history of India